Connections Academy, a for-profit corporate provider of online school products and services to virtual schools for grades K-12, including full-time online schools with the name Connections Academy, in the United States and International Connections Academy for students residing abroad. Based in Columbia, Maryland, Connections Academy is part of Pearson's Online and Blended Learning K-12 group. Online schools are an alternative to traditional public schools. Similar to charter schools, they are subsidized by the State.  Although they contract with many non-profit schools, they are a for-profit corporation.

History
In the spring of 2001, Sylvan Ventures started a separate business unit to create a virtual school program with its first virtual schools in Wisconsin and Colorado. The company first began providing online school services to two schools in the fall of 2002. In September 2004, Connections Academy was sold to an investor group led by Apollo Management, L.P. The company now operates public schools under management contracts from charter schools or school districts.

A new corporate entity called Connections Education was established in early 2011. In this same year, on September 15, 2011, Pearson, an international learning company, acquired Connections Education for more than $400 million.

Connections Education is currently Pearson's Online & Blended Learning division, which delivers the Connections Academy online public school program and other online learning services called Pearson Connexus to educational institutions and other organizations nationwide.  A private online school called International Connections Academy serves students across the globe. In 2019 it was announced that UK-based Harrow school would deliver an online education option leveraging Pearson Connexus.

Notable alumni 

 Ashley Argota, actress and singer
 Kiri Baga, figure skater, Minnesota Connections Academy
 Karen Chen, figure skater
 Nathan Chen, figure skater, California Connections Academy
 Ria Cheruvu, child prodigy, Arizona Connections Academy
 Eugenia Cooney, internet personality
 Grace McCallum, artistic gymnast
 Mirai Nagasu, figure skater, Capistrano Connections Academy
 Eric Sjoberg, figure skater, Capistrano Connections Academy
 Vincent Zhou, figure skater, Capistrano Connections Academy

Notable staff 

 Cheron Brylski, speechwriter, helped establish Louisiana Connections Academy
 Casey J, gospel singer, elementary school math teacher at Georgia Connections Academy
 Frank Riggs, politician, founding board president at Arizona Connections Academy
 Matt Wingard, politician, spokesman for Oregon Connections Academy

References

External links
AdvancED Accreditation Commission

Education companies established in 2001
Online K–12 schools
Companies based in Columbia, Maryland
Curricula
Education companies of the United States
American educational websites
2001 establishments in the United States
2004 mergers and acquisitions
2011 mergers and acquisitions